This is a list of significant events involving American television in 2011. Events listed include television show debuts, finales, cancellations, and channel launches, closures and re-branding, as well as information about controversies and carriage disputes.

Events

January

February

March

April

May

June

July

August

September

October

November

December

Programs

Debuts

Entering syndication this year

Changes of network affiliation

Returning this year
The following shows returned with new episodes after being canceled previously:

Milestone episodes

Ending this year

Made-for-TV movies and miniseries

Awards

Television stations

Stations changing network affiliation
The following is a list of television stations making noteworthy network affiliation changes during 2011.

Station launches

Station closures

Births

Deaths

January

February

March

April

May

June

July

August

September

October

November

December

See also
 2011 in the United States
 List of American films of 2011

References

External links
List of 2011 American television series at IMDb

 
2011